Oreostemma is a genus of flowering plants in the family Asteraceae. Species are found in western North America, with two endemic to California.

 Species
 Oreostemma alpigenum (Tundra aster) — California, Nevada, Oregon, Washington, Idaho, Montana, Wyoming
 Oreostemma elatum (Plumas alpine aster) — Sierra Nevada, California 
 Oreostemma peirsonii (Peirson's aster) — endemic to California, in the southern Sierra Nevada.

References

External links

Astereae
Flora of the Western United States
Asteraceae genera